Bentley Heath is a village in the West Midlands Borough of Solihull, England, approximately 3 miles southeast of Solihull town centre. The population taken at the 2011 census can be found under the Local Authority.

Location
Bentley Heath is to the north of the M40 and east of the M42 which, along with a small but important green belt area, separates the village and its larger neighbours of Dorridge and Knowle from the Birmingham conurbation. It falls in the Meriden Gap and historically was part of Warwickshire. It is 125 metres (400 ft) above sea-level, located on the Midlands Plateau. The village shares the B93 postcode with its larger contiguous neighbours Dorridge and Knowle.

Features
There is a relatively large amount of green space to be found in Bentley Heath, with the park, Bentley Heath School fields and various small greens dotted around the residential roads. In the village itself is the aforementioned C of E school, a village hall, a butcher's, a local Co-Operative store, a carpet shop, a post office and a newsagent. There is a beauty salon, a hair salon, a cafe and an Indian restaurant, plus a fruit and vegetable Grocery shop in the village centre and an Edward VII pillar box situated under a large oak tree next to the bus stop.
The only Public House in Bentley Heath is The Drum & Monkey which is owned by the Chef & Brewer chain.

History

Earliest existence
It is likely that the Heath was first inhabited in Anglo Saxon times. The Domesday Book records the land as belonging to Turchil of Warwick. After changing hands a number of times, the most famous Lord of the Manor was Lord Byron after whose wife Lady Byron Lane in Knowle is named. Widney Manor is referred to back in the reign of Henry III. Bentley Heath was first mentioned in its own right in 1280 where reference was made to the "Heath at Benteley".

Widney Manor came into the ownership of the Holbech family in the reign of Elizabeth I. No one landlord owned the land of Bentley Heath as the estate was split up in 1738; in the mid-19th century the main landowners were Thomas Haydon, Lady Noel Byron and Ann Musgrove.

Around 1850, the Great Western Railway was built, splitting the estate in two. The Muntz family bought some of the land in the latter part of the 19th century.

Bentley Heath Church of England Primary School
Bentley Heath C of E Primary School is the only primary school in the village.

Neighbourhood Forum
Knowle, Dorridge and Bentley Heath Neighbourhood Forum was formed in 2015 with the purpose of bringing together the people from the three adjoining villages to define how they would like to see the villages develop in the future.  The Forum will collate the policies developed into a draft Neighbourhood Plan for the three villages during 2017, and subsequently arrange for a local referendum to create the Neighbourhood Plan as a statutory planning document for the area.  The Forum is run entirely by volunteers, and by Spring 2017 had a membership of over 800.

References
Bentley Heath and Widney Manor, Edna G. Handley, 1992, 

Villages in the West Midlands (county)
Solihull